Bandar-e Gasheh (also known as Gasheh and Jesheh) is a village in Moghuyeh Rural District, in the Central District of Bandar Lengeh County, Hormozgan Province, Iran. At the 2006 census, its population was 509, in 103 families.

References 

Populated places in Bandar Lengeh County